Tilbrook is an English-language surname. A 19th-century source states that the name was confined mostly to the county of Essex, and that there was a William de Tilbroc recorded in the Hundred Rolls for Lincolnshire in the 13th century.

Notable people with the name include:

 Adrian Tilbrook, British drummer
 Glenn Tilbrook (born 1957), British singer and guitarist with Squeeze
 H. H. Tilbrook (Henry Hammond Tilbrook, 1848–1937), Welsh-born Australian landscape photographer and newspaper owner
 John Tilbrook (born 1946), Australian rules footballer
 Paula Tilbrook (1930–2019), British actress known for her role as Betty Eagleton in the ITV soap opera Emmerdale
 Robin Tilbrook (born 1958), British solicitor, leader of the English Democrats

References 

Surnames